Matongo (Tarime) is a ward in the Tarime District of the Mara Region of Tanzania, East Africa. In 2016 the Tanzania National Bureau of Statistics report there were 21,160 people in the ward, from 19,176 in 2012.

Villages / neighborhoods 
The ward has 4 villages and 30 hamlets.

 Nyangoto
 Botanga
 Kegonga A
 Kegonga B
 Kemagutu
 Kenyangi
 Kwinyunyi
 Masangora
 Nyabibago
 Nyamerama
 Senta shule
 Nyabichune
 Kemachale
 Komaware
 Kwimange
 Masinki
 Nyabichune
 Nyarero
 Mjini Kati
 Kebamonche
 Mjini Kati
 Mlimani
 Nyabikondo
 Nyankuru
 Sungusungu
 Matongo
 Botanga
 Kemagutu
 Kenyangi
 Kwinyunyi
 Masangora
 Nyabibago
 Nyamerama
 Senta shule

References

Tarime District
Mara Region